Christo Lategan 'Boeta' Hamman (born ) is a South African rugby union player who last played for the  in Super Rugby, the  in the Currie Cup and the  in the Rugby Challenge. His regular position is fly-half.

Rugby career

Hamman was born in Stilbaai and attended Hoër Landbouskool Oakdale in nearby Riversdale.

After school, Hamman moved to Pretoria to join the  academy, and played for them at Under-19 level in 2016 and Under-21 level in 2017, as well as representing local university side  in the Varsity Cup competition.

References

South African rugby union players
Living people
1997 births
People from Hessequa Local Municipality
Rugby union fly-halves
Blue Bulls players
Bulls (rugby union) players
Rugby union players from the Western Cape